Herb Alpert / Hugh Masekela is collaborative studio album by Herb Alpert and Hugh Masekela. It was recorded in Hollywood, California, and released in 1978 via A&M Records and Horizon Records labels.

Track listing

Personnel

Acoustic guitar – Tommy Tedesco (tracks: 5)
Arranged by – Caiphus Semenya, Herb Alpert, Hugh Masekela, Stewart Levine
Backing vocals – Caiphus Semenya, Herb Alpert, Hugh Masekela, Lani Hall, Letta Mbulu
Bass – Chuck Domanico
Bass – Louis Johnson (tracks: 1)
Co-producer – Hugh Masekela
Concertmaster – Gerald Vinci
Design – Chuck Beeson
Drums – Carlos Vega (tracks: 5), James Gadson, Spider Webb (tracks: 6)
Flugelhorn – Hugh Masekela
Flugelhorn, trumpet – Herb Alpert
French horn – Marylin L. Robinson, Sidney Isaac Muldrow
Guitar – Arthur Adams, Freddie Harris, Lee Ritenour
Guitar – Arthur Adams (tracks: 7)
Mastered by – Bernie Grundman
Orchestrated By – Donald Cooke
Percussion – Paulinho Da Costa
Piano – Caiphus Semenya, Hotep Cecil Barnard
Producer – Caiphus Semenya, Herb Alpert, Stewart Levine
Synthesizer – Craig Hindley (tracks: 4), Michael Boddicker (tracks: 6)
Synthesizer – Ian Underwood
Trombone – Donald Cooke, George Bohanon
Trombone (bass) – Maurice Spears

References

External links

1978 albums
Hugh Masekela albums
Herb Alpert albums
Albums produced by Stewart Levine
Albums produced by Herb Alpert
Horizon Records albums
A&M Records albums
Collaborative albums